Tobais is both a surname and a given name. Notable people with the name include:

Deji Tobais (born 1991), British sprinter
Tobais Palmer (born 1990), American football player

See also
Tobias